NGC 127 is a lenticular galaxy that was discovered on November 4, 1850, by Bindon Stoney, the same day he discovered NGC 126 and NGC 130. NGC 127 is a gas-rich, star-forming galaxy showing emission lines. It is an interacting companion to the peculiar, edge-on galaxy NGC 128, and the pair are connected by a bridge of material. The south-east part of NGC 127 is asymmetrical in the direction of NGC 128. It may have recently passed the more massive NGC 128, from which an infall of gas is flowing onto NGC 127.

References

External links 
 

Lenticular galaxies
Astronomical objects discovered in 1850
0127
01787
Pisces (constellation)